Paracyprichromis nigripinnis is a species of cichlid endemic to Lake Tanganyika where it is only known from the northern end of the lake.  It can reach a length of  TL.  This species can also be found in the aquarium trade.

References

nigripinnis
Taxa named by George Albert Boulenger
Fish described in 1901
Fish of Lake Tanganyika
Taxonomy articles created by Polbot